Ki Jadu Korila is a Bangladeshi Bengali-language film directed by Chandan Chowdhury. Chowdhury has worked as assistant director with Bangladeshi filmmaker Abdullah Al Mamun. This was Chandan Chowdhury's film direction debut. It was released in 2008 during Eid-ul-Fitr and won National Award in 6 categories.

Cast

Crew
 Director: Chandan Chowdhury
 Producer: Anowar Hossain Mintu
 Story: Chandan Chowdhury
 Music: Alam Khan
 Cinematography: Mahfuzur Rahman Khan
 Editing: Sahidul Haque
 Distributor: Sadia Hossain Kothachitra

Music

Soundtrack

References

External links

2008 films
Bengali-language Bangladeshi films
Bangladeshi musical drama films
2000s musical drama films
Films scored by Alam Khan
2000s Bengali-language films
2008 drama films